Bride of The Nile (translit. A'roos El Nil) is a 1963 Egyptian fantasy film directed by Fatin Abdel Wahab.

Cast
 Lobna Abdel Aziz as Hamis
 Rushdy Abaza as Samy Fouad
 Shwikar as Didi
 Abdel Moneim Ibrahim as Fathy
 Fouad Shafik as Doctor Hassan

See also
 Cinema of Egypt
 Lists of Egyptian films
 List of Egyptian films of the 1960s

References

External links

1963 films
1960s Arabic-language films
1960s fantasy films
Egyptian fantasy films
Films directed by Fatin Abdel Wahab